Brachodes neglectus is a species of moth from the family Brachodidae. It is found in Kyrgyzstan and possibly Xinjiang in north-western China.

The wingspan is about 23 mm. The forewings are grey with whitish-yellow scales.

References

Moths described in 1998
Brachodidae